Leucopogon lloydiorum is a species of flowering plant in the heath family Ericaceae and is endemic to the south-west of Western Australia. It is a slender shrub with elliptic leaves clustered near the ends of branchlets, and white, densely-bearded, tube-shaped flowers.

Description
The upper surface of the leaves is glabrous and the lower surface has several prominent longitudinal veins. Flowering has been observed in March.

Taxonomy and naming
Leucopogon lloydiorum was first formally described in 1986 by Arne Strid in the journal Willdenowia from specimens he collected near the Fitzgerald River National Park in 1983. The specific epithet (lloydiorum) honours Martin Lloyd, the ranger in the Fitzgerald River National Park, and his wife Viv.

Distribution and habitat
This leucopogon grows on white sand in the Esperance Plains bioregion of south-western Western Australia. The type specimen was growing in low mallee heath.

Conservation status
Leucopogon lloydiorum is classified as "not threatened" by the Western Australian Government Department of Biodiversity, Conservation and Attractions.

References

lloydiorum
Ericales of Australia
Flora of Western Australia
Plants described in 1986
Taxa named by Arne Strid